The Golden Neptune (Italian: Nettuno d'oro) is a prize conferred by the City of Bologna, since 1974, to citizens, companies, associations and cultural institutions that have brought honour to the city, through their professional or public activity. The prize, awarded by resolution of the municipal council of Bologna, is a reproduction of the statue of the Neptune fountain in Piazza Maggiore, a symbol of the city.

The prize is not to be confused with another of the same name, awarded since 1971, by the Bologna chapter of the Lions Club, for emerging local artists.

Winners

Note

External links
 List of winners; Comune di Bologna

Culture in Bologna
Orders, decorations, and medals of Italy
Italian awards